Mount Japfü, is a mountain peak of the Barail Range, located in Kohima District of Nagaland about  south of Kohima, the capital of Nagaland.

Mount Japfü holds the Guinness World Record for the tallest Rhododendron tree in the world.

See also
List of mountains in Nagaland

References

External links

Mountains of Nagaland
Landforms of Nagaland